In control theory, we may need to find out whether or not a system such as

One of the many ways one can achieve such goal is by the use of the Controllability Gramian.

Controllability in LTI Systems

One can observe if the LTI system is or is not controllable simply by looking at the pair . Then, we can say that the following statements are equivalent:

1. The pair  is controllable.

2. The  matrix

is nonsingular for any .

3. The  controllability matrix

has rank n.

4. The  matrix

If, in addition, all eigenvalues of  have negative real parts ( is stable), and the unique solution of the Lyapunov equation

is positive definite, the system is controllable. The solution is called the Controllability Gramian and can be expressed as

In the following section we are going to take a closer look at the Controllability Gramian.

Controllability Gramian 

The controllability Gramian can be found as the solution of the Lyapunov equation given by

In fact, we can see that if we take

as a solution, we are going to find that:

This shows us that  is indeed the solution for the Lyapunov equation under analysis.

Properties 

We can use again the fact that, if  is stable (all its eigenvalues have negative real part) to show that  is unique. In order to prove so, suppose we have two different solutions for

Then we have:

using the fact that  as :

In other words,  has to be unique.

Also, we can see that

is positive for any t (assuming the non-degenerate case where  is not identically zero). This makes  a positive definite matrix.

More properties of controllable systems can be found in, as well as the proof for the other equivalent statements of “The pair  is controllable” presented in section Controllability in LTI Systems.

Discrete Time Systems 

For discrete time systems as

One can check that there are equivalences for the statement “The pair  is controllable” (the equivalences are much alike for the continuous time case).

is positive definite and given by

That is called the discrete Controllability Gramian. More properties and proofs can be found in.

Linear Time Variant Systems 

Linear time variant (LTV) systems are those in the form:

That is, the matrices ,  and  have entries that varies with time. Again, as well as in the continuous time case and in the discrete time case, one may be interested in discovering if the system given by the pair  is controllable or not. This can be done in a very similar way of the preceding cases.

The system  is controllable at time  if and only if there exists a finite  such that the  matrix, also called the Controllability Gramian, given by

Again, we have a similar method to determine if a system is or is not a controllable system.

Properties of Wc(t0,t1) 

We have that the Controllability Gramian  have the following property:

More about the Controllability Gramian can be found in.

See also 

 Controllability
 Observability Gramian
 Gramian matrix
 Minimum energy control
 Hankel singular value

References

External links
Mathematica function to compute the controllability Gramian

Control theory